This list of birds of Washington  includes species credibly documented in the U.S. state of Washington. Unless otherwise noted, the list is that of the Washington Bird Records Committee (WBRC) of the Washington Ornithological Society. As of November 2021, the list contained 522 species. Of them, 159 are considered accidental; 11 were introduced to North America or directly in Washington, and 13 have only sight records. Five species that have not been seen since 1971 have the year of the most recent sighting noted.

This list is presented in the taxonomic sequence of the Check-list of North and Middle American Birds, 7th edition through the 62nd Supplement, published by the American Ornithological Society (AOS). Common and scientific names are also those of the Check-list, except that the common names of families are from the Clements taxonomy because the AOS list does not include them.

Unless otherwise noted, all species listed below are considered to occur regularly in Washington as permanent residents, summer or winter visitors, or migrants. The following codes are used to annotate some species:

(A) Accidental - species which have "20 or fewer Washington records during the previous 10-year period" according to the WBRC. The WBRC requires a formal report for sightings of these species to be included in the official record.
(S) Sight record - species whose records are supported only by written documentation, per the WBRC
(I) Introduced - a species introduced to Washington by humans, either directly or indirectly

Ducks, geese, and waterfowl

Order: AnseriformesFamily: Anatidae

The family Anatidae includes the ducks and most duck-like waterfowl, such as geese and swans. These birds are adapted to an aquatic existence with webbed feet, bills which are flattened to a greater or lesser extent, and feathers that are excellent at shedding water due to special oils. Forty-seven species have been recorded in Washington.

Fulvous whistling-duck, Dendrocygna bicolor (A)
Emperor goose, Anser canagica
Snow goose, Anser caerulescens
Ross's goose, Anser rossii
Greater white-fronted goose, Anser albifrons
Taiga bean-goose, Anser fabalis (A)
Brant, Branta bernicla
Cackling goose, Branta hutchinsii
Canada goose, Branta canadensis
Trumpeter swan, Cygnus buccinator
Tundra swan, Cygnus columbianus
Whooper swan, Cygnus cygnus (A)
Wood duck, Aix sponsa
Baikal teal, Sibirionetta formosa (A)
Garganey, Spatula querquedula (A)
Blue-winged teal, Spatula discors
Cinnamon teal, Spatula cyanoptera
Northern shoveler, Spatula clypeata
Gadwall, Mareca strepera
Falcated duck, Mareca falcata (A)
Eurasian wigeon, Mareca penelope
American wigeon, Mareca americana
Mallard, Anas platyrhynchos
Northern pintail, Anas acuta
Green-winged teal, Anas crecca
Canvasback, Aythya valisineria
Redhead, Aythya americana
Ring-necked duck, Aythya collaris
Tufted duck, Aythya fuligula
Greater scaup, Aythya marila
Lesser scaup, Aythya affinis
Steller's eider, Polysticta stelleri (A)
King eider, Somateria spectabilis (A)
Common eider, Somateria mollissima (A)
Harlequin duck, Histrionicus histrionicus
Surf scoter, Melanitta perspicillata
White-winged scoter, Melanitta deglandi
Black scoter, Melanitta americana
Long-tailed duck, Clangula hyemalis
Bufflehead, Bucephala albeola
Common goldeneye, Bucephala clangula
Barrow's goldeneye, Bucephala islandica
Smew, Mergellus albellus (A)
Hooded merganser, Lophodytes cucullatus
Common merganser, Mergus merganser
Red-breasted merganser, Mergus serrator
Ruddy duck, Oxyura jamaicensis

New World quail
Order: GalliformesFamily: Odontophoridae

The New World quails are small, plump terrestrial birds only distantly related to the quails of the Old World, but named for their similar appearance and habits. Three species have been recorded in Washington.

Mountain quail,  Callipepla pictus
Northern bobwhite, Colinus virginianus (I)
California quail, Callipepla californica (I)

Pheasants, grouse, and allies
Order: GalliformesFamily: Phasianidae

Phasianidae consists of the pheasants and their allies. These are terrestrial species, variable in size but generally plump with broad relatively short wings. Many species are gamebirds or have been domesticated as a food source for humans. Eleven species have been recorded in Washington.

Wild turkey, Meleagris gallopavo (I)
Ruffed grouse, Bonasa umbellus
Greater sage-grouse, Centrocercus urophasianus
Spruce grouse, Canachites canadensis
White-tailed ptarmigan, Lagopus leucurus
Dusky grouse, Dendragapus obscurus
Sooty grouse, Dendragapus fuliginosus
Sharp-tailed grouse, Tympanuchus phasianellus
Gray partridge, Perdix perdix (I)
Ring-necked pheasant, Phasianus colchicus (I)
Chukar, Alectoris chukar (I)

Grebes
Order: PodicipediformesFamily: Podicipedidae

Grebes are small to medium-large freshwater diving birds. They have lobed toes and are excellent swimmers and divers. However, they have their feet placed far back on the body, making them quite ungainly on land. Six species have been recorded in Washington.

Pied-billed grebe, Podilymbus podiceps
Horned grebe, Podiceps auritus
Red-necked grebe, Podiceps grisegena
Eared grebe, Podiceps nigricollis
Western grebe, Aechmorphorus occidentalis
Clark's grebe, Aechmorphorus clarkii

Pigeons and doves
Order: ColumbiformesFamily: Columbidae

Pigeons and doves are stout-bodied birds with short necks and short slender bills with a fleshy cere. Five species have been recorded in Washington.

Rock pigeon, Columba livia (I)
Band-tailed pigeon, Patagioenas fasciata
Eurasian collared-dove, Streptopelia decaocto (I)
White-winged dove, Zenaida asiatica (A)
Mourning dove, Zenaida macroura

Cuckoos
Order: CuculiformesFamily: Cuculidae

The family Cuculidae includes cuckoos, roadrunners, and anis. These birds are of variable size with slender bodies, long tails, and strong legs. Two species have been recorded in Washington.

Yellow-billed cuckoo, Coccyzus americanus (A)
Black-billed cuckoo, Coccyzus erythropthalmus (A)

Nightjars and allies
Order: CaprimulgiformesFamily: Caprimulgidae

Nightjars are medium-sized nocturnal birds that usually nest on the ground. They have long wings, short legs, and very short bills. Most have small feet, of little use for walking, and long pointed wings. Their soft plumage is cryptically colored to resemble bark or leaves. Two species have been recorded in Washington.

Common nighthawk,  Chordeiles minor
Common poorwill,  Phalaenoptilus nuttallii

Swifts
Order: ApodiformesFamily: Apodidae

The swifts are small birds which spend the majority of their lives flying. These birds have very short legs and never settle voluntarily on the ground, perching instead only on vertical surfaces. Many swifts have very long, swept-back wings which resemble a crescent or boomerang. Three species have been recorded in Washington.

Black swift, Cypseloides niger
Vaux's swift, Chaetura vauxi
White-throated swift, Aeronautes saxatalis

Hummingbirds
Order: ApodiformesFamily: Trochilidae

Hummingbirds are small birds capable of hovering in mid-air due to the rapid flapping of their wings. They are the only birds that can fly backwards. Nine species have been recorded in Washington.

Ruby-throated hummingbird, Archilochus colubris (A)
Black-chinned hummingbird, Archilochus alexandri
Anna's hummingbird, Calypte anna
Costa's hummingbird, Calypte costae (A)
Calliope hummingbird, Selasphorus calliope
Rufous hummingbird, Selasphorus rufus
Allen's hummingbird, Selasphorus sasin (A)
Broad-tailed hummingbird, Selasphorus platycercus (A)
Broad-billed hummingbird, Cynanthus latirostris (A)

Rails, gallinules, and coots

Order: GruiformesFamily: Rallidae

Rallidae is a large family of small to medium-sized birds which includes the rails, crakes, coots, and gallinules. The most typical family members occupy dense vegetation in damp environments near lakes, swamps, or rivers. In general they are shy and secretive birds, making them difficult to observe. Most species have strong legs and long toes which are well adapted to soft uneven surfaces. They tend to have short, rounded wings and tend to be weak fliers. Five species have been recorded in Washington.

Virginia rail, Rallus limicola
Sora, Porzana carolina
American coot, Fulica americana
Purple gallinule, Porphyrio martinicus (A)
Yellow rail, Coturnicops noveboracensis (A)

Cranes
Order: GruiformesFamily: Gruidae

Cranes are large, long-legged, and long-necked birds. Unlike the similar-looking but unrelated herons, cranes fly with necks outstretched, not pulled back. Most have elaborate and noisy courting displays or "dances". Two species have been recorded in Washington.

Sandhill crane, Antigone canadensis
Common crane, Grus grus (A)

Stilts and avocets
Order: CharadriiformesFamily: Recurvirostridae

Recurvirostridae is a family of large wading birds which includes the avocets and stilts. The avocets have long legs and long up-curved bills. The stilts have extremely long legs and long, thin, straight bills. Two species have been recorded in Washington.

Black-necked stilt, Himantopus mexicanus
American avocet, Recurvirostra americana

Oystercatchers
Order: CharadriiformesFamily: Haematopodidae

The oystercatchers are large, obvious, and noisy plover-like birds, with strong bills used for smashing or prising open molluscs. One species has been recorded in Washington.

Black oystercatcher, Haematopus bachmani

Plovers and lapwings

Order: CharadriiformesFamily: Charadriidae

The family Charadriidae includes the plovers, dotterels, and lapwings. They are small to medium-sized birds with compact bodies, short thick necks, and long, usually pointed, wings. They are found in open country worldwide, mostly in habitats near water. Twelve species have been recorded in Washington.

Black-bellied plover, Pluvialis squatarola
American golden-plover, Pluvialis dominica
Pacific golden-plover, Pluvialis fulva
Eurasian dotterel, Charadrius morinellus (A)
Killdeer, Charadrius vociferus
Common ringed plover, Charadrius hiaticula (A) (S)
Semipalmated plover, Charadrius semipalmatus
Piping plover, Charadrius melodus (A)
Lesser sand-plover, Charadrius mongolus (A)
Wilson's plover, Charadrius wilsonia (A)
Snowy plover, Charadrius nivosus
Mountain plover, Charadrius montanus (A)

Sandpipers and allies
Order: CharadriiformesFamily: Scolopacidae

Scolopacidae is a large diverse family of small to medium-sized shorebirds including the sandpipers, curlews, godwits, shanks, tattlers, woodcocks, snipes, dowitchers, and phalaropes. The majority of these species eat small invertebrates picked out of the mud or soil. Different lengths of legs and bills enable multiple species to feed in the same habitat, particularly on the coast, without direct competition for food. Forty-four species have been recorded in Washington.

Upland sandpiper, Bartramia longicauda (A)
Bristle-thighed curlew, Numenius tahitiensis (A)
Whimbrel, Numenius phaeopus
Long-billed curlew, Numenius americanus
Bar-tailed godwit, Limosa lapponica
Hudsonian godwit, Limosa haemastica
Marbled godwit, Limosa fedoa
Ruddy turnstone, Arenaria interpres
Black turnstone, Arenaria melanocephala
Red knot, Calidris canutus
Surfbird, Calidris virgata
Ruff, Calidris pugnax
Sharp-tailed sandpiper, Calidris acuminata
Stilt sandpiper, Calidris himantopus
Curlew sandpiper, Calidris ferruginea (A)
Temminck's stint, Calidris temminckii (A)
Red-necked stint, Calidris ruficollis (A)
Sanderling, Calidris alba
Dunlin, Calidris alpina
Rock sandpiper, Calidris ptilocnemis
Baird's sandpiper, Calidris bairdii
Little stint, Calidris minuta (A)
Least sandpiper, Calidris minutilla
White-rumped sandpiper, Calidris fuscicollis (A)
Buff-breasted sandpiper, Calidris subruficollis
Pectoral sandpiper, Calidris melanotos
Semipalmated sandpiper, Calidris pusilla
Western sandpiper, Calidris mauri
Short-billed dowitcher, Limnodromus griseus
Long-billed dowitcher, Limnodromus scolopaceus
Jack snipe, Lymnocryptes minimus (A) (S)
Wilson's snipe, Gallinago delicata
Spotted sandpiper, Actitis macularia
Solitary sandpiper, Tringa solitaria
Gray-tailed tattler, Tringa brevipes (A)
Wandering tattler, Tringa incana
Lesser yellowlegs, Tringa flavipes
Willet, Tringa semipalmata
Spotted redshank, Tringa erythropus (A) (S)
Greater yellowlegs, Tringa melanoleuca
Wood sandpiper, Tringa glareola (A)
Wilson's phalarope, Phalaropus tricolor
Red-necked phalarope, Phalaropus lobatus
Red phalarope, Phalaropus fulicarius

Skuas and jaegers
Order: CharadriiformesFamily: Stercorariidae

Skuas are in general medium to large birds, typically with gray or brown plumage, often with white markings on the wings. They have longish bills with hooked tips and webbed feet with sharp claws. They look like large dark gulls, but have a fleshy cere above the upper mandible. They are strong, acrobatic fliers. Four species have been recorded in Washington.

South polar skua, Stercorarius maccormicki
Pomarine jaeger, Stercorarius pomarinus
Parasitic jaeger, Stercorarius parasiticus
Long-tailed jaeger, Stercorarius longicaudus

Auks, murres, and puffins
Order: CharadriiformesFamily: Alcidae

The family Alcidae includes auks, murres, and puffins. These are short winged birds that live on the open sea and normally only come ashore for breeding. Sixteen species have been recorded in Washington.

Common murre, Uria aalge
Thick-billed murre, Uria lomvia (A)
Pigeon guillemot, Cepphus columba
Long-billed murrelet, Brachyramphus perdix (A)
Marbled murrelet, Brachyramphus marmoratus
Kittlitz's murrelet, Brachyramphus brevirostris (A)
Scripps's murrelet, Synthliboramphus scrippsi
Guadalupe murrelet, Synthliboramphus hyoleucus (A)
Ancient murrelet, Synthliboarmphus antiquus
Cassin's auklet, Ptychoramphus aleuticus
Parakeet auklet, Aethia psittacula
Least auklet, Aethia pusilla (A)
Crested auklet, Aethia cristatella (A)
Rhinoceros auklet, Cerorhinca monocerata
Horned puffin, Fratercula corniculata
Tufted puffin, Fratercula cirrhata

Gulls, terns, and skimmers

Order: CharadriiformesFamily: Laridae

Laridae is a family of medium to large seabirds and includes gulls, terns, kittiwakes, and skimmers. They are typically gray or white, often with black markings on the head or wings. They have stout, longish bills and webbed feet. Thirty-one species have been recorded in Washington.

Swallow-tailed gull, Creagrus furcatus (A)
Black-legged kittiwake, Rissa tridactyla
Red-legged kittiwake, Rissa brevirostris (A)
Ivory gull, Pagophila eburnea (A)
Sabine's gull, Xema sabini
Bonaparte's gull, Chroicocephalus philadelphia
Black-headed gull, Chroicocephalus ridibundus (A)
Little gull, Hydrocoloeus minutus (A)
Ross's gull, Rhodostethia rosea (A)
Laughing gull, Leucophaeus atricilla (A)
Franklin's gull, Leucophaeus pipixcan
Black-tailed gull, Larus crassirostris (A)
Heermann's gull, Larus heermanni
Short-billed gull,Larus brachyrhynchus
Ring-billed gull, Larus delawarensis
Western gull, Larus occidentalis
California gull, Larus californicus
Herring gull, Larus argentatus
Iceland gull, Larus glaucoides
Lesser black-backed gull, Larus fuscus
Slaty-backed gull, Larus schistisagus (A)
Glaucous-winged gull, Larus glaucescens
Glaucous gull, Larus hyperboreus
Great black-backed gull, Larus marinus (A)
Least tern, Sternula antillarum (A)
Caspian tern, Hydroprogne caspia
Black tern, Chlidonias niger
Common tern, Sterna hirundo
Arctic tern, Sterna paradisaea
Forster's tern, Sterna forsteri
Elegant tern, Thalasseus elegans

Tropicbirds
Order: PhaethontiformesFamily: Phaethontidae

Tropicbirds are slender white birds of tropical oceans with exceptionally long central tail feathers. Their long wings have black markings, as does the head. One species has been recorded in Washington.

Red-billed tropicbird, Phaethon aethereus (A)

Loons
Order: GaviiformesFamily: Gaviidae

Loons are aquatic birds the size of a large duck, to which they are unrelated. Their plumage is largely gray or black, and they have spear-shaped bills. Loons swim well and fly adequately, but are almost hopeless on land, because their legs are placed towards the rear of the body. Five species have been recorded in Washington.

Red-throated loon, Gavia stellata
Arctic loon, Gavia arctica (A)
Pacific loon, Gavia pacifica
Common loon, Gavia immer
Yellow-billed loon, Gavia adamsii

Albatrosses
Order: ProcellariiformesFamily: Diomedeidae

The albatrosses are amongst the largest of flying birds, and the great albatrosses from the genus Diomedea have the largest wingspans of any extant birds. Four species have been recorded in Washington.

White-capped albatross, Thalassarche cauta (A)
Laysan albatross, Phoebastria immutabilis
Black-footed albatross, Phoebastria nigripes
Short-tailed albatross, Phoebastria albatrus

Southern storm-petrels
Order: ProcellariiformesFamily: Oceanitidae

The storm-petrels are the smallest seabirds, relatives of the petrels, feeding on planktonic crustaceans and small fish picked from the surface, typically while hovering. The flight is fluttering and sometimes bat-like. Until 2018, this family's three species were included with the other storm-petrels in family Hydrobatidae.

Wilson's storm-petrel, Oceanites oceanicus (A)

Northern storm-petrels
Order: ProcellariiformesFamily: Hydrobatidae

Though the members of this family are similar in many respects to the southern storm-petrels, including their general appearance and habits, there are enough genetic differences to warrant their placement in a separate family.

Fork-tailed storm-petrel, Hydrobates furcatus
Leach's storm-petrel, Hydrobates leucorhous
Ashy storm-petrel, Hydrobates homochroa (A)

Shearwaters and petrels

Order: ProcellariiformesFamily: Procellariidae

The procellariids are the main group of medium-sized "true petrels", characterized by united nostrils with medium septum and a long outer functional primary. Fifteen species have been recorded in Washington.

Northern giant-petrel, Macronectes halli (A)
Northern fulmar, Fulmarus glacialis
Providence petrel, Pterodroma solandri (A)
Murphy's petrel, Pterodroma ultima 
Mottled petrel, Pterodroma inexpectata 
Hawaiian petrel, Pterodroma sandwichensis (A)
Cook's petrel, Pterodroma cookii (A)
Wedge-tailed shearwater, Ardenna pacificus (A)
Buller's shearwater, Ardenna bulleri
Short-tailed shearwater, Ardenna tenuirostris
Sooty shearwater, Ardenna griseus
Great shearwater, Ardenna gravis (A)
Pink-footed shearwater, Ardenna creatopus
Flesh-footed shearwater, Ardenna carneipes
Manx shearwater, Puffinus puffinus

Frigatebirds
Order: SuliformesFamily: Fregatidae

Frigatebirds are large seabirds usually found over tropical oceans. They are large, black, or black-and-white, with long wings and deeply forked tails. The males have colored inflatable throat pouches. They do not swim or walk and cannot take off from a flat surface. Having the largest wingspan-to-body-weight ratio of any bird, they are essentially aerial, able to stay aloft for more than a week. One species has been recorded in Washington.

Magnificent frigatebird, Fregata magnificens (A)

Boobies and gannets
Order: SuliformesFamily: Sulidae

The sulids comprise the gannets and boobies. Both groups are medium-large coastal seabirds that plunge-dive for fish. Four species have been recorded in Washington.

Nazca booby, Sula granti (A)
Blue-footed booby, Sula nebouxii (A)
Brown booby, Sula leucogaster
Red-footed booby, Sula sula (A)

Cormorants and shags
Order: SuliformesFamily: Phalacrocoracidae

Cormorants are medium-to-large aquatic birds, usually with mainly dark plumage and areas of colored skin on the face. The bill is long, thin, and sharply hooked. Their feet are four-toed and webbed. Three species have been recorded in Washington.

Brandt's cormorant, Urile penicillatus
Pelagic cormorant, Urile pelagicus
Double-crested cormorant, Nannopterum auritum

Pelicans
Order: PelecaniformesFamily: Pelecanidae

Pelicans are very large water birds with a distinctive pouch under their beak. Like other birds in the order Pelecaniformes, they have four webbed toes. Two species have been recorded in Washington.

American white pelican, Pelecanus erythrorhynchos
Brown pelican, Pelecanus occidentalis

Herons, egrets, and bitterns
Order: PelecaniformesFamily: Ardeidae

The family Ardeidae contains the herons, egrets, and bitterns. Herons and egrets are medium to large wading birds with long necks and legs. Bitterns tend to be shorter necked and more secretive. Members of Ardeidae fly with their necks retracted, unlike other long-necked birds such as storks, ibises, and spoonbills. Nine species have been recorded in Washington.

American bittern, Botaurus lentiginosus
Great blue heron, Ardea herodias
Great egret, Ardea alba
Snowy egret, Egretta thula (A)
Little blue heron, Egretta caerulea (A)
Cattle egret, Bubulcus ibis (A)
Green heron, Butorides virescens
Black-crowned night-heron, Nycticorax nycticorax
Yellow-crowned night-heron, Nyctanassa violacea (A)

Ibises and spoonbills
Order: PelecaniformesFamily: Threskiornithidae

The family Threskiornithidae includes the ibises and spoonbills. They have long, broad wings. Their bodies tend to be elongated, the neck more so, with rather long legs. The bill is also long, decurved in the case of the ibises, straight and distinctively flattened in the spoonbills. Three species have been recorded in Washington.

White ibis, Eudocimus albus (A)
Glossy ibis, Plegadis falcinellus (A)
White-faced ibis, Plegadis chihi

New World vultures
Order: CathartiformesFamily: Cathartidae

The New World vultures are not closely related to Old World vultures, but superficially resemble them because of convergent evolution. Like the Old World vultures, they are scavengers; however, unlike Old World vultures, which find carcasses by sight, New World vultures have a good sense of smell with which they locate carcasses. Two species have been recorded in Washington.

Turkey vulture, Cathartes aura
California condor, Gymnogyps californianus (A) (S) extirpated

Osprey
Order: AccipitriformesFamily: Pandionidae

Pandionidae is a monotypic family of fish-eating birds of prey.  Its single species possesses a very large and powerful hooked beak, strong legs, strong talons, and keen eyesight.

Osprey, Pandion haliaetus

Hawks, eagles, and kites
Order: AccipitriformesFamily: Accipitridae

Accipitridae is a family of birds of prey, which includes hawks, eagles, kites, harriers, and Old World vultures. These birds have very large powerful hooked beaks for tearing flesh from their prey, strong legs, powerful talons, and keen eyesight. Fifteen species have been recorded in Washington.

White-tailed kite, Elanus leucurus (A)
Golden eagle, Aquila chrysaetos
Northern harrier, Circus hudsonius
Sharp-shinned hawk, Accipiter striatus
Cooper's hawk, Accipiter cooperii
Northern goshawk, Accipiter gentilis
Bald eagle, Haliaeetus leucocephalus
Red-shouldered hawk, Buteo lineatus
Broad-winged hawk, Buteo platypterus
Swainson's hawk, Buteo swainsoni
Zone-tailed hawk, Buteo albonotatus (A)
Red-tailed hawk, Buteo jamaicensis
Rough-legged hawk, Buteo lagopus
Ferruginous hawk, Buteo regalis

Barn-owls
Order: StrigiformesFamily: Tytonidae

Barn-owls are medium to large owls with large heads and characteristic heart-shaped faces. They have long strong legs with powerful talons. One species has been recorded in Washington.

Barn owl, Tyto alba

Owls
Order: StrigiformesFamily: Strigidae

Typical owls are small to large solitary nocturnal birds of prey. They have large forward-facing eyes and ears, a hawk-like beak, and a conspicuous circle of feathers around each eye called a facial disk. Fourteen species have been recorded in Washington.

Flammulated owl, Psiloscops flammeolus
Western screech-owl, Megascops kennicottii
Great horned owl, Bubo virginianus
Snowy owl, Bubo scandiacus
Northern hawk owl, Surnia ulula
Northern pygmy-owl, Glaucidium gnoma
Burrowing owl, Athene cunicularia
Spotted owl, Strix occidentalis
Barred owl, Strix varia
Great gray owl, Strix nebulosa
Long-eared owl, Asio otus
Short-eared owl, Asio flammeus
Boreal owl, Aegolius funereus
Northern saw-whet owl, Aegolius acadicus

Kingfishers
Order: CoraciiformesFamily: Alcedinidae

Kingfishers are medium-sized birds with large heads, long, pointed bills, short legs, and stubby tails. One species has been recorded in Washington.

Belted kingfisher, Megaceryle alcyon

Woodpeckers
Order: PiciformesFamily: Picidae

Woodpeckers are small to medium-sized birds with chisel-like beaks, short legs, stiff tails, and long tongues used for capturing insects. Some species have feet with two toes pointing forward and two backward, while several species have only three toes. Many woodpeckers have the habit of tapping noisily on tree trunks with their beaks. Thirteen species have been recorded in Washington.

Lewis's woodpecker, Melanerpes lewis
Acorn woodpecker, Melanerpes formicivorus
Williamson's sapsucker, Sphyrapicus thyroideus
Yellow-bellied sapsucker, Sphyrapicus varius (A)
Red-naped sapsucker, Sphyrapicus nuchalis
Red-breasted sapsucker, Sphyrapicus ruber
American three-toed woodpecker, Picoides dorsalis
Black-backed woodpecker, Picoides arcticus
Downy woodpecker, Dryobates pubescens
Hairy woodpecker, Dryobates villosus
White-headed woodpecker, Dryobates albolarvatus
Northern flicker, Colaptes auratus
Pileated woodpecker, Dryocopus pileatus

Falcons and caracaras
Order: FalconiformesFamily: Falconidae

Falconidae is a family of diurnal birds of prey, notably the falcons and caracaras. They differ from hawks, eagles, and kites in that they kill with their beaks instead of their talons. Eight species have been recorded in Washington.

Crested caracara, Caracara plancus (A)
Eurasian kestrel, Falco tinnunculus (A)
American kestrel, Falco sparverius
Merlin, Falco columbarius
Eurasian hobby, Falco subbuteo (A)
Gyrfalcon, Falco rusticolus
Peregrine falcon, Falco peregrinus
Prairie falcon, Falco mexicanus

Tyrant flycatchers
Order: PasseriformesFamily: Tyrannidae

Tyrant flycatchers are Passerine birds which occur throughout North and South America. They superficially resemble the Old World flycatchers, but are more robust and have stronger bills. They do not have the sophisticated vocal capabilities of the songbirds. Most, but not all, are rather plain. As the name implies, most are insectivorous. Twenty-four species have been recorded in Washington.

Dusky-capped flycatcher, Myiarchus tuberculifer (A)
Ash-throated flycatcher, Myiarchus cinerascens
Variegated flycatcher, Empidonomus varius (A)
Tropical kingbird, Tyrannus melancholicus
Western kingbird, Tyrannus verticalis
Eastern kingbird, Tyrannus tyrannus
Scissor-tailed flycatcher, Tyrannus forficatus (A)
Fork-tailed flycatcher, Tyrannus savana (A)
Olive-sided flycatcher, Contopus cooperi
Greater pewee, Contopus pertinax (A) (S)
Western wood-pewee, Contopus sordidulus
Eastern wood-pewee, Contopus virens (A)
Yellow-bellied flycatcher, Empidonax flaviventris (A)
Alder flycatcher, Empidonax alnorum (A)
Willow flycatcher, Empidonax traillii
Least flycatcher, Empidonax minimus
Hammond's flycatcher, Empidonax hammondii
Gray flycatcher, Empidonax wrightii
Dusky flycatcher, Empidonax oberholseri
Pacific-slope flycatcher, Empidonax difficilis
Black phoebe, Sayornis nigricans
Eastern phoebe, Sayornis phoebe (A)
Say's phoebe, Sayornis saya
Vermilion flycatcher, Pyrocephalus rubinus (A)

Vireos, shrike-babblers, and erpornis
Order: PasseriformesFamily: Vireonidae

The vireos are a group of small to medium-sized passerine birds mostly restricted to the New World, though a few other members of the family occur in Asia. They are typically greenish in color and resemble wood warblers apart from their heavier bills. Nine species have been recorded in Washington.

White-eyed vireo, Vireo griseus (A) (S)
Bell's vireo, Vireo bellii (A)
Hutton's vireo, Vireo huttoni
Yellow-throated vireo, Vireo flavifrons (A)
Cassin's vireo, Vireo cassinii
Blue-headed vireo, Vireo solitarius (A)
Philadelphia vireo, Vireo philadelphicus (A) (S)
Warbling vireo, Vireo gilvus
Red-eyed vireo, Vireo olivaceus

Shrikes
Order: PasseriformesFamily: Laniidae

Shrikes are passerine birds known for their habit of catching other birds and small animals and impaling the uneaten portions of their bodies on thorns. A shrike's beak is hooked, like that of a typical bird of prey. Two species have been recorded in Washington.

Loggerhead shrike, Lanius ludovicianus
Northern shrike, Lanius borealis

Crows, jays, and magpies
Order: PasseriformesFamily: Corvidae

The family Corvidae includes crows, ravens, jays, choughs, magpies, treepies, nutcrackers, and ground jays. Corvids are above average in size among the Passeriformes, and some of the larger species show high levels of intelligence. Ten species have been recorded in Washington.

Canada jay, Perisoreus canadensis
Pinyon jay, Gymnorhinus cyanocephalus (A)
Steller's jay, Cyanocitta stelleri
Blue jay, Cyanocitta cristata
California scrub-jay, Aphelocoma californica
Woodhouse's scrub-jay, Aphelocoma woodhouseii (A)
Clark's nutcracker, Nucifraga columbiana
Black-billed magpie, Pica hudsonia
American crow, Corvus brachyrhynchos
Common raven, Corvus corax

Tits, chickadees, and titmice
Order: PasseriformesFamily: Paridae

The Paridae are mainly small stocky woodland species with short stout bills. Some have crests. They are adaptable birds, with a mixed diet including seeds and insects. Four species have been recorded in Washington.

Black-capped chickadee, Poecile atricapilla
Mountain chickadee, Poecile gambeli
Chestnut-backed chickadee, Poecile rufescens
Boreal chickadee, Poecile hudsonica

Larks
Order: PasseriformesFamily: Alaudidae

Larks are small terrestrial birds with often extravagant songs and display flights. Most larks are fairly dull in appearance. Their food is insects and seeds. Two species have been recorded in Washington.

Eurasian skylark, Alauda arvensis (I) (A)
Horned lark, Eremophila alpestris

Swallows
Order: PasseriformesFamily: Hirundinidae

The family Hirundinidae is adapted to aerial feeding. They have a slender streamlined body, long pointed wings, and a short bill with a wide gape. The feet are adapted to perching rather than walking, and the front toes are partially joined at the base. Seven species have been recorded in Washington.

Bank swallow, Riparia riparia
Tree swallow, Tachycineta bicolor
Violet-green swallow, Tachycineta thalassina
Northern rough-winged swallow, Stelgidopteryx serripennis
Purple martin, Progne subis
Barn swallow, Hirundo rustica
Cliff swallow, Petrochelidon pyrrhonota

Long-tailed tits
Order: PasseriformesFamily: Aegithalidae

Long-tailed tits are a group of small passerine birds with medium to long tails. They make woven bag nests in trees. Most eat a mixed diet which includes insects. One species has been recorded in Washington.

Bushtit, Psaltriparus minimus

Kinglets
Order: PasseriformesFamily: Regulidae

The kinglets are a small family of birds which resemble the titmice. They are very small insectivorous birds. The adults have colored crowns, giving rise to their names. Two species have been recorded in Washington.

Ruby-crowned kinglet, Corthylio calendula
Golden-crowned kinglet, Regulus satrapa

Waxwings
Order: PasseriformesFamily: Bombycillidae

The waxwings are a group of passerine birds with soft silky plumage and unique red tips to some of the wing feathers. In the Bohemian and cedar waxwings, these tips look like sealing wax and give the group its name. These are arboreal birds of northern forests. They live on insects in summer and berries in winter. Two species have been recorded in Washington.

Bohemian waxwing, Bombycilla garrulus
Cedar waxwing, Bombycilla cedrorum

Silky-flycatchers
Order: PasseriformesFamily: Ptiliogonatidae

The silky-flycatchers are a small family of passerine birds which occur mainly in Central America, although the range of one species extends to central California. They are related to waxwings, and like that group have soft silky plumage, usually gray or pale-yellow. They have small crests. One species has been recorded in Washington.

Phainopepla, Phainopepla nitens (A)

Nuthatches
Order: PasseriformesFamily: Sittidae

Nuthatches are small woodland birds. They have the unusual ability to climb down trees head first, unlike other birds which can only go upwards. Nuthatches have big heads, short tails, and powerful bills and feet. Three species have been recorded in Washington.

Red-breasted nuthatch, Sitta canadensis
White-breasted nuthatch, Sitta carolinensis
Pygmy nuthatch, Sitta pygmaea

Treecreepers
Order: PasseriformesFamily: Certhiidae

Treecreepers are small woodland birds, brown above and white below. They have thin pointed down-curved bills which they use to extricate insects from bark. They have stiff tail feathers, like woodpeckers, which they use to support themselves on vertical trees. One species has been recorded in Washington.

Brown creeper, Certhia americana

Gnatcatchers
Order: PasseriformesFamily: Polioptilidae

These dainty birds resemble Old World warblers in their structure and habits, moving restlessly through the foliage seeking insects. The gnatcatchers are mainly soft bluish gray in color and have the typical insectivore's long sharp bill. Many species have distinctive black head patterns (especially males) and long, regularly cocked, black-and-white tails. One species has been recorded in Washington.

Blue-gray gnatcatcher, Polioptila caerulea

Wrens
Order: PasseriformesFamily: Troglodytidae

Wrens are small and inconspicuous birds, except for their loud songs. They have short wings and thin down-turned bills. Several species often hold their tails upright. All are insectivorous. Seven species have been recorded in Washington.

Rock wren, Salpinctes obsoletus
Canyon wren, Catherpes mexicanus
House wren, Troglodytes aedon
Pacific wren, Troglodytes pacificus
Winter wren, Troglodytes hiemalis (A)
Marsh wren, Cistothorus palustris
Bewick's wren, Thryomanes bewickii

Mockingbirds and thrashers
Order: PasseriformesFamily: Mimidae

The mimids are a family of passerine birds which includes thrashers, mockingbirds, tremblers, and the New World catbirds. These birds are notable for their vocalization, especially their remarkable ability to mimic a wide variety of birds and other sounds heard outdoors. The species tend towards dull grays and browns in their appearance. Four species have been recorded in Washington.

Gray catbird, Dumetella carolinensis
Brown thrasher, Toxostoma rufum (A)
Sage thrasher, Oreoscoptes montanus
Northern mockingbird, Mimus polyglottos

Starlings
Order: PasseriformesFamily: Sturnidae

Starlings are small to medium-sized passerine birds with strong feet. Their flight is strong and direct and they are very gregarious. Their preferred habitat is fairly open country, and they eat insects and fruit. Plumage is typically dark with a metallic sheen. One species has been recorded in Washington.

European starling, Sturnus vulgaris (I)

Dippers
Order: PasseriformesFamily: Cinclidae

Dippers are small, stout, birds that feed in cold, fast moving streams. One species has been recorded in Washington.

American dipper, Cinclus mexicanus

Thrushes and allies
Order: PasseriformesFamily: Turdidae

The thrushes are a group of passerine birds that occur mainly but not exclusively in the Old World. They are plump, soft plumaged, small to medium-sized insectivores or sometimes omnivores, often feeding on the ground. Many have attractive songs. Ten species have been recorded in Washington.

Western bluebird, Sialia mexicana
Mountain bluebird, Sialia currucoides
Townsend's solitaire, Myadestes townsendi
Veery, Catharus fuscescens
Swainson's thrush, Catharus ustulatus
Hermit thrush, Catharus guttatus
Dusky thrush, Turdus eunomus (A) (S)
Redwing, Turdus iliacus (A)
American robin, Turdus migratorius
Varied thrush, Ixoreus naevius

Old World flycatchers
Order: PasseriformesFamily: Muscicapidae

The Old World flycatchers form a large family of small passerine birds. These are mainly small arboreal insectivores, many of which, as the name implies, take their prey on the wing. Two species have been recorded in Washington.

Red-flanked bluetail, Tarsiger cyanurus (A)
Northern wheatear, Oenanthe oenanthe (A)

Accentors
Order: PasseriformesFamily: Prunellidae

The accentors are small, fairly drab birds with thin sharp bills. They are superficially similar to sparrows but are not closely related. They are endemic to the Palearctic and only appear in North America as a vagrant. One species has been recorded in Washington.

Siberian accentor, Prunella montanella (A)

Old World sparrows
Order: PasseriformesFamily: Passeridae

Old World sparrows are small passerine birds. In general, sparrows tend to be small plump brownish or grayish birds with short tails and short powerful beaks. Sparrows are seed eaters, but they also consume small insects. One species has been recorded in Washington.

House sparrow, Passer domesticus (I)

Wagtails and pipits
Order: PasseriformesFamily: Motacillidae

Motacillidae is a family of small passerine birds with medium to long tails. They include the wagtails, longclaws, and pipits. They are slender ground-feeding insectivores of open country. Five species have been recorded in Washington.

Eastern yellow wagtail, Motacilla tschutschensis (A)
Gray wagtail, Motacilla cinerea (A)
White wagtail, Motacilla alba (A)
Red-throated pipit, Anthus cervinus (A) (S)
American pipit, Anthus rubescens

Finches, euphonias, and allies
Order: PasseriformesFamily: Fringillidae

Finches are seed-eating passerine birds that are small to moderately large and have a strong beak, usually conical and in some species very large. All have twelve tail feathers and nine primaries. These birds have a bouncing flight with alternating bouts of flapping and gliding on closed wings, and most sing well. Fifteen species have been recorded in Washington.

Brambling, Fringilla montifringilla (A)
Evening grosbeak, Coccothraustes vespertinus
Pine grosbeak, Pinicola enucleator
Gray-crowned rosy-finch, Leucosticte tephrocotis
House finch, Haemorhous mexicanus
Purple finch, Haemorhous purpureus
Cassin's finch, Haemorhous cassinii
Common redpoll, Acanthis flammea
Hoary redpoll, Acanthis hornemanni (A)
Red crossbill, Loxia curvirostra
White-winged crossbill, Loxia leucoptera
Pine siskin, Spinus pinus
Lesser goldfinch, Spinus psaltria
Lawrence's goldfinch, Spinus lawrencei (A)
American goldfinch, Spinus tristis

Longspurs and snow buntings
Order: PasseriformesFamily: Calcariidae

The Calcariidae are a group of passerine birds that had been traditionally grouped with the New World sparrows, but differ in a number of respects and are usually found in open grassy areas. Six species have been recorded in Washington.

Lapland longspur, Calcarius lapponicus
Chestnut-collared longspur, Calcarius ornatus (A)
Smith's longspur, Calcarius pictus (A)
Thick-billed longspur, Rhyncophanes mccownii (A) (S)
Snow bunting, Plectrophenax nivalis
McKay's bunting, Plectrophenax hyperboreus (A)

Old World buntings
Order: PasseriformesFamily: Emberizidae

Emberizidae is a family of passerine birds containing a single genus. Until 2017, the New World sparrows (Passerellidae) were also considered part of this family. Two species have been recorded in Washington.

Little bunting, Emberiza pusilla (A)
Rustic bunting, Emberiza rustica (A)

New World sparrows
Order: PasseriformesFamily: Passerellidae

Until 2017, these species were considered part of the family Emberizidae. Most of the species are known as sparrows, but these birds are not closely related to the Old World sparrows which are in the family Passeridae. Many of these have distinctive head patterns. Twenty-five species have been recorded in Washington.

Grasshopper sparrow, Ammodramus savannarum
Black-throated sparrow, Amphispiza bilineata
Lark sparrow, Chondestes grammacus
Lark bunting, Calamospiza melanocorys (A)
Chipping sparrow, Spizella passerina
Clay-colored sparrow, Spizella pallida
Field sparrow, Spizella pusilla (A)
Brewer's sparrow, Spizella breweri
Fox sparrow, Passerella iliaca
American tree sparrow, Spizelloides arborea
Dark-eyed junco, Junco hyemalis
White-crowned sparrow, Zonotrichia leucophrys
Golden-crowned sparrow, Zonotrichia atricapilla
Harris's sparrow, Zonotrichia querula
White-throated sparrow, Zonotrichia albicollis
Sagebrush sparrow, Artemisiospiza nevadensis
Vesper sparrow, Pooecetes gramineus
LeConte's sparrow, Ammospiza leconteii (A)
Nelson's sparrow, Ammospiza nelsoni (A) (S)
Savannah sparrow, Passerculus sandwichensis
Song sparrow, Melospiza melodia
Lincoln's sparrow, Melospiza lincolnii
Swamp sparrow, Melospiza georgiana
Green-tailed towhee, Pipilo chlorurus
Spotted towhee, Pipilo maculatus

Yellow-breasted chat
Order: PasseriformesFamily: Icteriidae

This species was historically placed in the wood-warblers (Parulidae) but nonetheless most authorities were unsure if it belonged there. It was placed in its own family in 2017.

Yellow-breasted chat, Icteria virens

Troupials and allies
Order: PasseriformesFamily: Icteridae

The icterids are a group of small to medium-sized, often colorful passerine birds restricted to the New World and include the grackles, New World blackbirds, and New World orioles. Most species have black as a predominant plumage color, often enlivened by yellow, orange, or red. Sixteen species have been recorded in Washington.

Yellow-headed blackbird, Xanthocephalus xanthocephalus
Bobolink, Dolichonyx oryzivorus
Eastern meadowlark, Sturnella magna (A)
Western meadowlark, Sturnella neglecta
Orchard oriole, Icterus spurius (A)
Hooded oriole, Icterus cucullatus (A)
Bullock's oriole, Icterus bullockii
Baltimore oriole, Icterus galbula (A)
Scott's oriole, Icterus parisorum (A)
Red-winged blackbird, Agelaius phoeniceus
Tricolored blackbird, Agelaius tricolor
Brown-headed cowbird, Molothrus ater
Rusty blackbird, Euphagus carolinus
Brewer's blackbird, Euphagus cyanocephalus
Common grackle, Quiscalus quiscula (A)
Great-tailed grackle, Quiscalus mexicanus (A)

New World warblers
Order: PasseriformesFamily: Parulidae

The wood-warblers are a group of small often colorful passerine birds restricted to the New World. Most are arboreal, but some like the ovenbird and the two waterthrushes, are more terrestrial. Most members of this family are insectivores. Thirty-six species have been recorded in Washington.

Ovenbird, Seiurus aurocapilla (A)
Northern waterthrush, Parkesia noveboracensis
Golden-winged warbler, Vermivora chrysoptera (A)
Blue-winged warbler, Vermivora cyanoptera (A)
Black-and-white warbler, Mniotilta varia
Prothonotary warbler, Protonotaria citrea (A)
Tennessee warbler, Leiothlypis peregrina
Orange-crowned warbler, Leiothlypis celata
Lucy's warbler, Leiothlypis luciae (A)
Nashville warbler, Leiothlypis ruficapilla
MacGillivray's warbler, Geothlypis tolmiei
Mourning warbler, Geothlypis philadelphia (A) (S)
Kentucky warbler, Geothlypis formosa (A) (S)
Common yellowthroat, Geothlypis trichas
Hooded warbler, Setophaga citrina (A)
American redstart, Setophaga ruticilla
Cape May warbler, Setophaga tigrina (A)
Northern parula, Setophaga americana (A)
Magnolia warbler, Setophaga magnolia (A)
Bay-breasted warbler, Setophaga castanea (A)
Blackburnian warbler, Setophaga fusca (A)
Yellow warbler, Setophaga petechia
Chestnut-sided warbler, Setophaga pensylvanica
Blackpoll warbler, Setophaga striata (A)
Black-throated blue warbler, Setophaga caerulescens (A)
Palm warbler, Setophaga palmarum
Yellow-rumped warbler, Setophaga coronata
Yellow-throated warbler, Setophaga dominica (A)
Prairie warbler, Setophaga discolor (A)
Black-throated gray warbler, Setophaga nigrescens
Townsend's warbler, Setophaga townsendi
Hermit warbler, Setophaga occidentalis
Black-throated green warbler, Setophaga virens (A)
Canada warbler, Cardellina canadensis (A)
Wilson's warbler, Cardellina pusilla
Painted redstart, Myioborus pictus (A)

Cardinals and allies
Order: PasseriformesFamily: Cardinalidae

The cardinals are a family of robust seed-eating birds with strong bills. They are typically associated with open woodland. The sexes usually have distinct plumages. Ten species have been recorded in Washington.

Summer tanager, Piranga rubra (A)
Scarlet tanager, Piranga olivacea (A)
Western tanager, Piranga ludoviciana
Rose-breasted grosbeak, Pheucticus ludovicianus
Black-headed grosbeak, Pheucticus melanocephalus
Blue grosbeak, Passerina caerulea (A)
Lazuli bunting, Passerina amoena
Indigo bunting, Passerina cyanea (A)
Painted bunting, Passerina ciris (A)
Dickcissel, Spiza americana (A)

Notes

References

See also
List of birds of Mount Rainier National Park
List of birds of Olympic National Park
List of birds
Lists of birds by region
List of North American birds

External links
Washington Ornithological Society

Washington
Birds